Rail transport in the Netherlands uses a dense railway network which connects nearly all major towns and cities. There are as many train stations as there are municipalities in the Netherlands. Three-quarters of the lines have been electrified.

The Dutch rail network primarily supports passenger transport. Rail travel comprises the majority of the distance travelled on Dutch public transport. The national rail infrastructure is managed and maintained by the government agency ProRail, and a number of operators have concessions to operate their trains. The entire network is standard gauge. The Netherlands is a member of the International Union of Railways (UIC), and its country code is 84.

Most Dutch trains are equipped with Wi-Fi. They offer no onboard catering, except for a limited service on some international trains.

Operators

Public-transport authorities in the Netherlands issue concessions for groups of lines:
Nederlandse Spoorwegen  (NS; Dutch Railways) –  services the main passenger rail network (Hoofdrailnet), including limited night service
Arriva Netherlands – services the northern secondary lines around Leeuwarden and Groningen, some eastern secondary lines around Arnhem and Zutphen, the southern secondary lines in Limburg, and one central secondary line
Breng – services part of an eastern secondary line with Arriva
Keolis Nederland – services two eastern secondary lines (between Zwolle and Kampen and Zwolle and Enschede) and a secondary line (as Syntus) between Zutphen and Oldenzaal
Connexxion – services a secondary line between Ede-Wageningen and Amersfoort
Qbuzz – services the MerwedeLingelijn between Dordrecht and Geldermalsen
NS International - services international trains and domestic high-speed service.
Foreign railway operators with NS authorization service several Dutch stations:
DB Regio, including DB Regionalbahn Westfalen and DB Euregiobahn
NMBS/SNCB – Maastricht–Eijsden, as part of the Maastricht–Liège service; and also Roosendaal to Antwerpen and beyond.

A common fare system applies nationwide, although operators tend to use separate tariffs. Although most trains have first- and second-class compartiments, Keolis Nederland and (sometimes) Arriva have second-class compartments only. The Netherlands' largest cargo carrier is DB Schenker; others include ACTS, Crossrail, ERS Railways, Häfen und Güterverkehr Köln, Rail4chem and Veolia Cargo. The network is maintained by the government-owned ProRail, which is responsible for allocating slots to companies.

History

The Dutch National Railway Company (Nederlandse Spoorwegen/NS) was founded in 1837 and tasked with building the Dutch railway network. The first Dutch railway was built and opened in 1839 on a short stretch between Amsterdam and Haarlem, and was expanded between 1840 and 1847 to The Hague and Rotterdam. Further 19th-century expansion connected the rest of the country. Most of the main lines were electrified during the 20th century, beginning with the Hofpleinlijn in 1908. Since 1922, after a government-commission report, a 1.5 kV DC system with an overhead line has been used.

Network

The network focuses on passenger rail and connects nearly all major cities. A few towns still lack a train station, including Nieuwegein, Drachten, Amstelveen, Oosterhout, and Katwijk.

Most freight routes run east-west, connecting the Port of Rotterdam and Koninklijke Hoogovens in IJmuiden with Germany. Freight trains usually share the tracks with passenger trains; the only exception is the Betuweroute, which opened in 2007 as the first freight-only route.

The network is well-developed; no extensions are currently planned, although there is a focus on upgrading efficiency and capacity.

Major lines have been built in recent years, including the HSL-Zuid high-speed line, the Betuweroute and the Hanzelijn, connecting the province of Flevoland with the rail hub at Zwolle.

Most of the network is electrified at 1.5 kV DC (which limits interoperability with neighbouring countries), although Belgian trains – built for 3 kV DC – can run on the Dutch network at reduced power. Both the HSL-Zuid and the Betuweroute have been electrified at 25 kV AC; although conversion of existing electrified lines to 25 kV AC was considered in 1997, 2005 and 2012 at a cost of over €10 billion, a 2015 proposal (revised in 2017) is to convert to 3 kV DC at a 2017 cost of €1 billion. The higher DC voltage would reduce power losses and have faster acceleration above , so stopping trains would save seven to 20 seconds per stop.

Newer lines have been built to permit higher speeds.

Trains are frequent, with one or two trains per hour on lesser lines, two to four trains per hour on rural sections and up to eight or 10 trains per hour in cities. There are two types of trains: stoptreinen (local trains, which Dutch Railways calls "sprinters") and InterCities, with faster long-distance service. An intermediate category (sneltreinen, "fast trains") began being discontinued in 2007, although regional operators continue to use the term. Sneltrein and InterCity service was very similar.

In 2001,  were electrified at 1,500 V DC. Only  is single track. The country has 2,589 level crossings, of which 1,598 are protected. The system has 7,071 switch tracks, 12,036 signals, 725 rail viaducts, 455 rail bridges (of which 56 are movable), and 15 tunnels.

ProRail maintains Dutch rail infrastructure (except metros and trams), allocating rail capacity, and traffic control. Capacity supplied by ProRail is used by five public-transport operators and the cargo operators DB Schenker, ERS, ACTS and Rail4Chem. There are also small operators such as the seven-carriage Herik Rail, which can be chartered for parties and meetings.

New lines
Betuweroute: freight line from Rotterdam to Germany, electrified at 25 kV AC
Hemboog, between Schiphol/Amsterdam-Lelylaan and Zaandam, bypassing the crossing at Amsterdam Sloterdijk It provides a direct connection between Schiphol and Zaandam/Hoorn.
Gooiboog, between Hilversum/Naarden-Bussum and Almere Muziekwijk
Utrechtboog, between Schiphol/Amsterdam-Rai and Bijlmer/Utrecht, bypassing the crossing at Duivendrecht
HSL-Zuid, electrified at 25 kV AC
Lelystad–Zwolle railway (Hanzelijn): Lelystad-Dronten-Kampen-Zwolle
Rebuilt Maastricht-Lanaken line (2011-2016)

Two stations have a bi-level crossing, rather than a level or double junction requiring protection by signals: Amsterdam Sloterdijk and Duivendrecht. Other Dutch line crossings have grade separations.

Non-electrified lines
The following figure is the timetable number:
Groningen-Delfzijl (84)
Groningen-Roodeschool (83)
Groningen-Nieuweschans Grens (85)
Leeuwarden-Groningen (80)
Leeuwarden-Harlingen (81)
Leeuwarden-Stavoren (82)
Almelo-Marienberg (72)
Zutphen-Hengelo (73)
Enschede-Glanerbrug Grens (522)
Zutphen-Apeldoorn (67)
Zutphen-Winterswijk (71)
Arnhem-Winterswijk (70)
Arnhem-Tiel (68)
Nijmegen-Roermond (29)

Rolling stock
Dutch railways have a variety of rolling stock. Intercity trains have a yellow-and-blue colour scheme, and local trains are blue, white and yellow.

Current fleet

Future fleet

Links with adjacent countries
The Dutch network has several cross-border sections to Belgium and Germany. Terneuzen is linked to Belgium (freight only), but not to the rest of the Dutch network; Lanaken was at one time connected to Maastricht (also freight only), but not to the Belgian network. Seven cross-border links are electrified. Due to voltage differences, trains must change single-voltage locomotives at Bad Bentheim or Venlo; Belgian 3 kV trains reach Roosendaal and Maastricht with reduced power under the Dutch 1.5 kV. The HSL Zuid has no voltage change at the border. Multi-system train units or diesel traction are also used. Several border crossings are disused or freight-only, and there are no gauge breaks at any of the crossings.

To Germany, north to south:
 Nieuweschans to Weener – Not electrified; due to a damaged bridge, since 3 December 2015 only traffic to Weener just over the border.
 Ter Apel – German side never finished; Dutch side dismantled several years after construction.
 Coevorden to Emlichheim – Not electrified, goods only. German track reactivated for passenger service in 2019 as far as Neuenhaus.
 Oldenzaal to Bentheim – Voltage change (1.5 kV DC/15 kV AC) in Bentheim station.
 Glanerbrug to Gronau – Not electrified. At Enschede, the track is no longer connected to the Dutch network.
 Broekheurne to Alstätte – Dismantled
 Winterswijk
 To Borken – Disused, mostly dismantled
 To Bocholt – Dismantled
 Zevenaar to Elten – Voltage change (25 kV AC/15 kV AC) on the open track about 1 km southeast of Elten station, allowing only multi-system or diesel trains. (Formerly voltage change 1.5 kV DC/15 kV AC in Emmerich station.)
 Zevenaar via Elten to Kleve – Dismantled; branched off from the Zevenaar–Emmerich line when border operations were still handled on the Dutch side of the border.
 Groesbeek to Kranenburg – Disused
 Gennep to Goch – Dismantled; site of the 1940 German invasion of the Netherlands
 Venlo
 To Straelen – Dismantled
 To Kaldenkirchen – Voltage change (1.5 kV DC/15 kV AC) in Venlo station.
 Vlodrop-station to Dalheim – Iron Rhine, disused; reactivation has been under study for a long time with little progress.
 Eygelshoven-Markt to Herzogenrath – Voltage change (1.5 kV DC/15 kV AC) on the open track just inside the Netherlands.
 Bocholtz to Vetschau – Not electrified; heritage trains only, not connected to the German network.
To Belgium, east to west:
 Eijsden to Visé – Voltage change (1.5 kV DC/3 kV DC) just south of Maastricht Randwijck.
 Maastricht to Lanaken – Not electrified, freight only; no connection to the Belgian network; discontinued. Plans to use it for a tram line to Hasselt are making little progress.
 Budel to Hamont – Iron Rhine – Not electrified, freight only. Electrification on the Belgian side to Hamont has started in 2018 and is expected to be finished in 2020.
 Valkenswaard to Neerpelt – Dismantled
 Baarle-Nassau to Turnhout – Dismantled; nine border crossings, since the railway repeatedly passed in and out of Baarle-Hertog.
 Breda to Noorderkempen – Electrified at 25 kV AC; high-speed railway.
 Roosendaal to Essen – Voltage change (1.5 kV DC/3 kV DC) near the southern suburbs of Roosendaal.
 Hulst to Sint-Gillis-Waas – Dismantled
 Sas van Gent to Zelzate – Not electrified; freight only

International trains

Intercity Brussel, also called Beneluxtrein: Amsterdam Centraal–Schiphol–The Hague HS–Rotterdam Centraal–Antwerp-Centraal–Mechelen–Zaventem–Brussels-Centraal–Brussels-South
Thalys: Amsterdam Centraal–Schiphol Airport–Rotterdam Centraal–Antwerp-Centraal–Brussels-South–Paris North/Marne-la-Vallée–Chessy
During the winter and summer holiday seasons, an additional weekly train runs to Bourg-Saint-Maurice and Marseille respectively.
Eurostar: Amsterdam Centraal–Rotterdam Centraal–Brussels South-Lille Europe–London St Pancras
Intercity Berlijn: Amsterdam Centraal–Amersfoort Centraal-Deventer–Hengelo–Osnabrück Hbf–Hannover Hbf–Berlin Ostbahnhof
ICE International: Amsterdam Centraal–Utrecht Centraal–Arnhem Centraal–Oberhausen Hbf–Duisburg Hbf–Cologne Hbf–Frankfurt Hbf, some extended to Basel SBB.
Nightjet: Amsterdam Centraal–Utrecht Centraal–Arnhem Centraal–Düsseldorf Hbf–Nürnberg Hbf–Linz/Donau Hbf–Wien Hbf.
There are several regional cross-border connections.

Night service

NS offers a limited night service (Nachtnet). On weeknights, it is a U-shaped stretch with hourly service connecting Rotterdam Central, Delft, The Hague Hollands Spoor, Leiden Central, Schiphol Airport, Amsterdam Central and Utrecht Central (most of the Randstad's large cities and the main airport). Due to the U-shaped route, travel time from the first five stations to Utrecht is longer than during the day. Because the relatively-short distance between stations, no sleeping cars are used. During the weekend, night service is extended to Dordrecht and four cities in the province of North Brabant. On Friday and Saturday nights, there is an additional service between Rotterdam and Amsterdam.

Fares and tickets

A common fare system applies nationwide with NS ticket machines, although individual concessionaires have separate fares. The OV-chipkaart (public-transport card) permits ticket integration and price differentiation. Travellers must be aware of the different operators; for off-peak pass subscribers, a station requiring an operator change may experience delays during peak hours.

Printed paper tickets were discontinued on 9 July 2014. Although ticket machines sell cardboard tickets with an electric chip, there is a €1 surcharge per ticket in addition to the OV-chipkaart fare. The surcharge also applies to tickets sold over the counter. For international journeys, passengers can print a pdf ticket at home, which carries a barcode permitting access to stations,

Passengers without a valid ticket are fined €50 in addition to the base fare, unless a ticket machines is out of order or another exemption applies. The fine must to be paid at once, unless the passenger can provide a valid identification card; in that case, they will receive a collection notice by mail. Travellers from abroad beginning Dutch train journey at Schiphol must purchase a ticket before boarding the train.

Payment can be made with all major credit cards at all ticket vending machines and the website.

Off-peak discount passes
Off-peak hours are weekdays from midnight to 06:35, 08:55–16:05 and 18:25–24:00 and all day Saturday and Sunday. With a discount pass, the discount is automatically applied based on the type of discount product and the time of check-in. Discounts include free travel.

A  (off-peak discount pass) provides a 40-percent discount on travel beginning in off-peak hours. Up to four people can receive the discount if they have a public-transport card. A supplemental fare gives riders over age 60 years free off-peak travel seven days per year. Annual off-peak free passes (Dal Vrij) and unlimited passes are also available, with some restrictions.

Railways in the Dutch Caribbean

Saba, Sint Eustatius and Bonaire (the Caribbean Netherlands) have no railways, and there are no railways on Sint Maarten and Curaçao. Local tram service on Aruba began in 2012, built in cooperation with the Haguish tramway company HTM. Its rolling stock consists of one open, non-articulated single-deck tram and two open double-deckers, running on standard-gauge track. Two industrial narrow-gauge rail lines on the island have been removed.

See also

 Narrow-gauge railways in the Netherlands (historic)
 NS Intercity Materieel
 NS VIRM
 Public transport in the Netherlands
 Rail transport by country
 Railway stations in the Netherlands
 Train routes in the Netherlands
 Trains in the Netherlands
 Transport in the Netherlands

References

External links

Dutch Railways website 
ProRail railway map
http://www.sporenplan.nl/html_nl/sporenplan/ns/ns_normaal/start.html – Schematic maps of all tracks, switches and platforms:
http://kubus.mailspool.nl/spoorkaart Live map of locations of moving passenger trains
http://www.prorail.nl/Vervoerders/Infrastructuur/Documents/R-Overzicht%20Functionaliteitswijzigingen%20en%20Indienststellings-data%20Infraprojecten%20tot%20en%20met%202017.pdf – planning of changes in infrastructure